Steven Echevarria (born April 9, 1996) is an American soccer player who currently plays for Colorado Springs Switchbacks in the USL Championship.

Career

Youth
Born in Slate Hill, New York, Echevarria joined the New York Red Bulls Academy in 2011. He attended college at Wake Forest University and played on the Demon Deacons soccer team for four seasons, making 79 appearances, scoring 7 goals and tallying 6 assists. In 2017, Echevarria was named team captain.

While in college, Echevarria appeared for Premier Development League side New York Red Bulls U-23.

New York Red Bulls II
On February 14, 2018, Echevarria signed his first professional contract with United Soccer League side New York Red Bulls II. He made his professional debut on March 17, 2018, appearing as a starter for New York in a 2-1 win over Toronto FC II.

Colorado Springs Switchbacks
On November 16, 2020, Echevarria joined USL Championship side Colorado Springs Switchbacks ahead of their 2021 season.

Career statistics

References

External links
New York Red Bulls bio
Wake Forest University bio
 

1996 births
Living people
American soccer players
Wake Forest Demon Deacons men's soccer players
New York Red Bulls U-23 players
New York Red Bulls II players
Colorado Springs Switchbacks FC players
Association football midfielders
Soccer players from New York (state)
USL League Two players
USL Championship players
People from Orange County, New York